Night Bus is a 2017 Indonesian thriller film directed by Emil Heradi. The film won six awards at the Indonesian Film Festival in 2017, including Best Feature Film.

Plot 
This film tells the story of a bus traveling to Sampar, a city known for its rich natural resources. The city is heavily guarded by a group of soldiers who are on standby against rebel militants who demand independence for their homeland. Each passenger on this bus has their own destination. At first they thought that this would be a trip to the conflicted area as usual, but without them knowing, there was an intruder with an important message that had to be conveyed to Sampar. This important message is said to be able to end the conflict. However, the presence of this intruder endangers all passengers as he is wanted by the two warring parties. The situation becomes increasingly tense when everyone has to fight for their lives. They also have to face other parties that do not want the conflict to end, namely the opportunists, the maintainers of conflict because they live off conflict. No one knows, who will die and who will stay alive.

Production 
Wanting to create a new nuance in the world of Indonesian cinema, Teuku Rifnu Wikana and Darius Sinathrya ventured to make a thriller genre film entitled Night Bus, which took the story of separatist and humanitarian conflicts. This film is an adaptation of the short story Selamat written by Teuku Rifnu Wikana. The short story Selamat was inspired by Rifnu's experience when he traveled to conflict areas.

Accolades

References 

2010s Indonesian-language films
2017 films
Indonesian thriller films
2017 thriller films
Films about buses